Reba #1s is a double-disc compilation album released in 2005 celebrating Reba McEntire's thirty years in the music industry.  It is the first compilation of her career to include tracks from her early Mercury Records years along with her MCA recordings. The album features all of McEntire's solo number one hits spanning her career. The thirty-five-track compilation features twenty-two Billboard number-one hits, eleven non-Billboard number ones and two new tracks, "You're Gonna Be" (re-titled "You're Gonna Be (Always Loved by Me)" when released as a single) and "Love Needs a Holiday", which respectively reached 33 and 60 on the Hot Country Songs charts. Both of the new tracks were accompanied by videos. The album debuted and peaked at number four on the Billboard country album chart and number twelve on the Billboard 200. It has sold over 1 million copies and has been certified 2× Platinum by the RIAA because it is a double-disc compilation album.

The album's total figure of 33 includes all major United States country music charts. Twenty-two of the 33 songs reached No. 1 on the Billboard Hot Country Songs chart, with the remainder having topped either the country charts of Radio & Records or Gavin Report. The compilation and the two new tracks were produced by McEntire and Buddy Cannon.

The album debuted at number 3 on the Billboard country chart and number 12 on the Billboard 200 selling 110,000 copies in its first week.  The album has sold 1,195,800 copies in the United States as of April 2017.

Track listing

Personnel
The following musicians performed on "You're Gonna Be" and "Love Needs a Holiday":
Bruce Bouton – steel guitar
Spady Brannan – bass guitar
Perry Coleman – background vocals on "Love Needs a Holiday"
Eric Darken – percussion
Kenny Greenberg – electric guitar
Tommy Harden – drums
Jim Kimball – acoustic guitar
Reba McEntire – lead vocals
Jerry McPherson – electric guitar
Greg Morrow – extra drums on "Love Needs a Holiday"
Jimmy Nichols – piano, background vocals
Larry Paxton – extra bass guitar on "Love Needs a Holiday"
Tammy Rogers – fiddle on "Love Needs a Holiday"
Doug Sisemore – keyboards
Jennifer Wrinkle – background vocals on "You're Gonna Be"

Charts

Weekly charts

Year-end charts

Singles

Certifications and sales

References

2005 greatest hits albums
Reba McEntire compilation albums
Compilation albums of number-one songs
MCA Records compilation albums